Octavious Marquez "Tae" Davis (born August 14, 1996) is an American football linebacker for the Atlanta Falcons of the National Football League (NFL). He played college football at Chattanooga.

College career
Davis played in 49 games for the University of Tennessee at Chattanooga. He was moved to outside linebacker for his senior season after playing his first three years as a safety.

Professional career

New York Giants
Following the 2018 NFL Draft, Davis was signed by the New York Giants as an undrafted free agent. On September 1, 2018, it was announced that Davis had made the Giants' 53-man roster.

On October 29, 2019, Davis was waived by the Giants.

Cleveland Browns
Davis was claimed off waivers by the Cleveland Browns on October 30, 2019.

Houston Texans
On March 23, 2021, Davis signed with the Houston Texans. He was waived/injured on August 30, 2021 and placed on injured reserve.

On February 24, 2022, Davis re-signed with the Texans. He was released on August 21.

Las Vegas Raiders
On August 22, 2022, Davis signed with the Las Vegas Raiders. 

On August 28, 2022, Davis was placed on injured reserve and then, on September 2, 2022, he was released by the Raiders.

Cleveland Browns (second stint)
On November 29, 2022, Davis was signed to the Cleveland Browns practice squad. He was promoted to the active roster on December 31.

Atlanta Falcons
On March 17, 2023, Davis signed a one-year contract with the Atlanta Falcons.

References

External links
Chattanooga Mocs bio
New York Giants bio

1996 births
Living people
American football linebackers
Chattanooga Mocs football players
Houston Texans players
New York Giants players
People from Oxford, Alabama
Players of American football from Alabama
Cleveland Browns players
Las Vegas Raiders players
Atlanta Falcons players